Courageous Leaders is an American web television docuseries created by Executive Producer, Wilson Cleveland and hosted by Hartley Sawyer. The series, presented by Hiscox and distributed by Vox Media debuted on June 1, 2015 on Vox, The Verge, SB Nation and Curbed.

Premise 
In each episode, host Hartley Sawyer profiles a different entrepreneur who recounts their personal and professional experiences with overcoming fear, taking risks and handling failure.

Episodes

References

External links 

 

2010s American documentary television series
2015 American television series debuts